Irwin Brothers Store is a historic commercial building located at Stone Mills in Jefferson County, New York. It was built in phases between 1823 and approximately 1850.  It is a two-story, nine bay structure constructed of locally quarried blue limestone.  Also on the property is a late 19th-century carriage barn.  The property was purchased in 1978 by the Northern New York Agricultural Historical Society for use as a rural museum.

It was listed on the National Register of Historic Places in 1983.

References

Commercial buildings on the National Register of Historic Places in New York (state)
Federal architecture in New York (state)
Carriage houses in the United States
Buildings and structures in Jefferson County, New York
National Register of Historic Places in Jefferson County, New York